Atlético Olanchano was a Honduran football club based in Catacamas, Olancho.

The club last played in the Honduran second division.

History

Campamento
Atlético Olanchano was founded as Campamento in 1974 and originally played their games in Campamento, Olancho. The team later moved to Catacamas and so the name was remodified to Juventud Catacamas.

Atlético Olanchano
On July 17, 2001, the team was bought by some business men and they decided to change the name to Atletico Olanchano.

The club played in the top league for the first time as Campamento in the 1976/77 season. They were relegated the same year after finishing in last place.

The club returned as Atlético Olanchano when it was promoted to Liga Nacional de Futbol de Honduras for the first time in the 2003–04 season but were relegated back down to Liga de Ascenso de Honduras after they finished in last place in the 2004–05 season. The team was coached by Oswaldo Altamirano at that time. They were promoted back to Primera Division when they defeated Deportivo Lenca and became champions of Liga de Ascenso for the second time during the 2005–06 season. Unfortunately, the team was relegated for the second time on May 3, 2008 when they lost a match to Hispano on the last day of the regular season.

Achievements
Segunda División / Liga de Ascenso
Winners (3): 1975, 2002–03, 2005–06 A

League performance

 In 1976–77 as Campamento

All-time record vs. opponents
 As of 2007–08 Clausura

Dissolution
On 26 August 2016, the Honduran Liga Nacional de Ascenso decided to disaffiliate the franchise from the competition due to non-payment of the entrance fee to the 2016–17 season forcing the club's dissolution.

All-time top goalscorers

 Édgar Núñez 17
 Ney Costa 16
 Marcelo Ferreira 11

Former managers
  Santos "Cocodrilo" González (2005)
  Gilberto Yearwood (2006–2007)
  Edwin Pavón (2007–2008)

Followers
Mel Zelaya – Honduran President

References

External links
 Official Website

 
Olancho Department
Football clubs in Honduras
Association football clubs established in 2001
2001 establishments in Honduras